Presidential elections were held in Cyprus on 8 February 1998, with a second round on 15 February. The result was a victory for Glafcos Clerides of the Democratic Rally after he finished as runner-up behind George Iacovou (who was supported by AKEL and the Democratic Party) in the first round. Voter turnout was 91.7% in the first round and 93.4% in the second.

Results

References

President
Cyprus
Presidential elections in Cyprus
Cyprus